Patrick Sheehan may refer to:

 Patrick Sheehan (golfer) (born 1969), PGA Tour golfer
 Patrick Augustine Sheehan (1852–1913), Irish Catholic clergyman
 P. A. Ó Síocháin (1905–1995), Irish journalist, author, lawyer and Irish language activist
 P. J. Sheehan (born 1933), Cork politician
 Pat Sheehan (Irish republican) (born 1958), Northern Ireland MLA
 Patrick Sheehan (Oregon politician), politician in Oregon
 Patrick Francis Sheehan (1932–2012), Roman Catholic bishop in Nigeria
 "Glen of Aherlow" (song), also known as "Patrick Sheehan", an Irish song by Charles Kickham

See also
Pat Sheehan (disambiguation)